Jordan Lee Carstens (born January 22, 1981) is a former American football defensive tackle for the NFL's Carolina Panthers.  He was an undrafted free agent out of Iowa State University.  Jordan, a native of Bagley, Iowa, farms and enjoys hunting during his time away from the NFL.

High School Years
Carstens attended Panorama High School in Panora, Iowa. He was a two-year letterman in football and earned third-team All-State honors from the Des Moines Register as a senior.

College years
In 1999, Jordan walked-on at the 105th spot, which was the last spot for the two-a-days roster, on the Iowa State Cyclones football team, was red-shirted, and became the defensive scout team's player of the year.

In 2000 as a freshman defensiveman, Jordan earned academic first-team All Big 12 Conference honors.

In 2001 as a sophomore defensive tackle with 71 tackles (40 solo), he was selected to the third-team Big 12 Conference team, was an academic first-team All Big 12 Conference, was a CoSIDA/GTE District VII first-team Academic All-American, and was a second-team Verizon Academic All-American with a GPA of 3.52.

In 2002 as a junior defensive tackle with 97 tackles (a team high 13 for loss) and 6 sacks, he was Co-Captain of the ISU football team, earned a spot on the second-team All Big 12 Conference squad and the academic first-team All Big 12 Conference squad, was a CoSIDA/GTE District VII first-team Academic All-American, and was a first-team Verizon Academic All-American.

In 2003 as a senior defensive tackle, he was Co-Captain of the ISU football team and was a CoSIDA/GTE District VII first-team Academic All-American, a first-team Verizon Academic All-American, a first-team All-Big 12 Conference defensive lineman, and an academic first-team All Big 12 Conference scholar.

Jordan earned a degree from Iowa State University majoring in Agricultural Business and finished his collegiate football career with 306 tackles (23 for loss) and 10 sacks.

Professional career
Over the 2004-2006 seasons as a defensive lineman with the Carolina Panthers, Jordan played in 29 games and had 50 tackles (35 solo), 4 sacks, and 2 forced fumbles.

Carstens would eventually have to retire as a player due to kidney-related health problems. He often returns to Panora, Iowa, where he attended high school, to give speeches to the Panorama Panthers football team.

References

1981 births
Living people
American football defensive linemen
Iowa State Cyclones football players
Carolina Panthers players
People from Carroll, Iowa
People from Guthrie County, Iowa
People from Panora, Iowa